Marcelle Barbey-Gampert (1895–1987) was a Swiss botanist, geologist, and climatologist noted for phytogeographical studies of the Picos de Europa.

Works

References 

19th-century births
1954 deaths
20th-century Swiss women scientists
20th-century Swiss botanists